Ciclos  may refer to:
 Ciclos (Luis Enrique album), 2009
 Ciclos (Sol D'Menta album), 2006
 Ciclos (Gandhi album) 2004